This list is of the Historic Sites of Japan located within Ibaraki Prefecture.

National Historic Sites
As of January 1, 2021, thirty-three Sites have been designated as being of national significance (including three *Special Historic Sites).

|-
|}

Prefectural Historic Sites
As of November 1, 2020, fifty-seven Sites have been designated as being of prefectural importance.

Municipal Historic Sites
As of May 1, 2020, a further three hundred and eighty-two Sites have been designated as being of municipal importance.

Registered Historic Sites
As of January 1, 2021, one Monument has been registered (as opposed to designated) as an Historic Site at a national level.

See also

 Cultural Properties of Japan
 Hitachi Province
 Ibaraki Prefectural Museum of History
 List of Places of Scenic Beauty of Japan (Ibaraki)

References

External links
  Cultural Properties of Ibaraki Prefecture
  National Historic Sites in Ibaraki Prefecture
  Prefectural Historic Sites in Ibaraki Prefecture

Ibaraki Prefecture
 Ibaraki